Deuxhill is a hamlet and very small civil parish in Shropshire, England.

The nearest town is Bridgnorth. The hamlet is situated on the B4363 road, north of Billingsley. Between the two parishes flows the Horsford Brook. To the north and east is the small parish of Glazeley.

According to the 2001 census it had a population of 20. It is the smallest parish in Shropshire by area - the smallest by population is Boscobel.

Despite the small population, there is a village hall.

See also
Listed buildings in Deuxhill

References

Civil parishes in Shropshire
Hamlets in Shropshire